Alas, Babylon is a 1959 novel by American writer Pat Frank (the pen name of Harry Hart Frank).  It was one of the first apocalyptic novels of the nuclear age and has remained popular more than half a century after it was first published, consistently ranking in Amazon.com's Top 20 Science Fiction Short Stories list (which groups together short story collections and novels) and has an entry in David Pringle's book Science Fiction: The 100 Best Novels. The novel deals with the effects of a nuclear war on the fictional small town of Fort Repose, Florida, which is based upon the actual city of Mount Dora, Florida. The novel's title is derived from the Book of Revelation: "Alas, alas, that great city Babylon, that mighty city! for in one hour is thy judgment come." The cover art for the Bantam paperback edition was made by Robert Hunt.

Plot
The story is set in a fictional 1959, following two years of escalating tensions between the United States and the Soviet Union for dominance in the Middle East and in the Mediterranean Sea. The Soviets are menacing Turkey from three sides through their proxies in Egypt, Syria and Iraq in order to gain control of the Bosporus and give free passage to their large Mediterranean fleet. To counteract the Soviet menace the United States established a military presence in Lebanon and are providing aid to their Turkish and Israeli allies.

As detailed in the book, the Soviets gained a temporary space supremacy through the launch of a massive fleet of militarized Sputniks; moreover, they are aware that, within three or four years, the United States will cover the gap. Intelligence from a Soviet officer who defected in Berlin provided information about a Soviet war plan involving a sudden, overwhelming nuclear first strike on U.S. and NATO military and civilian targets, in order to minimize retaliation and become the leading world power. According to the leaked war plan the Soviet leadership considers acceptable the loss of 20 to 30 million of their own civilian population due to the retaliatory strike by NATO.

Narration follows the point of view of Randy Bragg, who lives an aimless life in the small Central Florida town of Fort Repose. His older brother, Colonel Mark Bragg, an Air Force Intelligence officer, sends a telegram ending in the words, "Alas, Babylon", a pre-established code between the brothers to warn of imminent disaster. Mark flies his family down to Fort Repose for their protection while he stays at Strategic Air Command headquarters at Offutt Air Force Base in Omaha, Nebraska.

Soon afterward, a U.S. fighter pilot, attempting to intercept an enemy plane over the Mediterranean, inadvertently destroys an ammunition depot in a large Soviet submarine base in Latakia, Syria. The explosion is mistaken for a large-scale U.S. air assault on the military facility and, by the following day, the Soviet Union retaliates with its planned full-scale nuclear strike against the United States and its allies. With Mark as a witness, U.S. missiles are sent in retaliation. Randy and his guests awake to the shaking from the bombing of nearby military bases; one explosion temporarily blinds Peyton, Randy's niece.

Fort Repose descends into chaos: tourists are trapped in their hotels, communication lines fail, the CONELRAD radio system barely operates, convicts escape from prisons and a run on the banks makes currency worthless.

In the weeks and months after the attack sporadic news gathered through an old but still-functioning vacuum tube radio receiver show that many major cities of the U.S. are in ruins and vast regions of the Continental United States are labeled by the government as off-limits, "contaminated zones". The whole of Florida is among the contaminated areas, leaving the stranded survivors of Fort Repose without hope of immediate assistance. Most of the government has been eliminated, with the U.S. presidency defaulting to Josephine Vanbruuker-Brown, the former Secretary of Health, Education and Welfare.
Other international broadcasts, heard over neighbor Sam Hazzard's shortwave radio, reveal that Western Europe was badly hit by Soviet missiles as well (a dire situation in southern France is mentioned). Soviet leadership was eliminated by U.S. retaliation and the capital of the Soviet Union was moved to Central Asia, but war still rages for months after the attack, although it is fought mostly between the remnants of U.S. Air Force and scattered Soviet Navy nuclear submarines.

Since Randy was an Army Reserve officer before the Soviet attack, a radio dispatch by President Vanbruuker-Brown formally empowers him as the local authority under the current emergency situation. Randy then organizes a community self-defense team against bandits and tries to rid the community of radioactive jewelry taken into Fort Repose from the radioactive ruins of Miami. The search for alternative food sources is also prominent in the months following the attack, leading to the launch of a rag-tag fleet of fishing boats to sift the surrounding swamps for fish and to a desperate search for much-needed salt.

The following year, an Air Force helicopter arrives at Fort Repose. The crew assess the status of the residents and the local environment, explaining that the area around Fort Repose is perhaps the largest patch of non-contaminated soil in the whole State of Florida and that, after all, the survivors of Fort Repose managed to fare better than many other places in the U.S. Randy also learns that his brother Mark most likely died when Omaha and Offutt Air Force Base were destroyed by multiple hits. When the crew of the helicopter offer to evacuate the residents out of Florida, the residents choose to stay.

It is finally revealed that the United States formally won the war, but at a tremendous cost: the country lost most of its population (45 million survivors are estimated overall), its military, its infrastructure and most of its natural resources (ironically, the government is planning to use the large stockpiles of military-grade uranium and plutonium left from the war to power the surviving towns and cities). The U.S. is now receiving food, fuel and medicine aid from third-world countries such as Thailand, Indonesia and Venezuela. Apparently, the "Three Greats" (deliberately left unclear but likely India, China and Japan) have taken the role of world leading powers in place of U.S. and Soviet Union.

Reception
Galaxy reviewer Floyd C. Gale gave the novel a mixed review, rating it three stars out of five and concluding: "Frank stopped too soon with too little."

Although the novel was published over 60 years ago, it is a popular read, being assigned in middle and high school English classes.

Effects of the novel on others

People
John Lennon, known for his pacifist views, was given a copy of Alas, Babylon by journalist Larry Kane in 1965. Lennon spent all night reading the book, fueling his anti-war fervor and envisioning the world's population attempting to crawl their way back from the horrors of a nuclear catastrophe.

Literature
In his critical study The Modern Weird Tale (2001), S. T. Joshi compares Alas, Babylon favourably with Stephen King's The Stand, calling the former "a more interesting treatment of the same basic theme."
In the foreword of the 2005 edition of Alas, Babylon, David Brin notes that the book was instrumental in shaping his views on nuclear war and influenced his own book, The Postman (1982).
In the acknowledgements section at the beginning of his post-apocalyptic novel One Second After (2009), William R. Forstchen credits Alas, Babylon as an influence in writing his novel about the small town of Black Mountain, North Carolina. The novel is set in a time after numerous electromagnetic pulses strike around the world, cutting off all sources of electricity to the town, and depicts the ensuing aftermath of sociological breakdown.
John Ringo's 2013 Under a Graveyard Sky, the first in his Black Tide Rising series, starts with an emergency code using the phrase "AlasBabylon." Frank's book is referenced as the characters' inspiration for that code, and is briefly synopsized.

Adaptations
An adaptation of Alas, Babylon was broadcast on April 3, 1960, as the 131st episode of the Playhouse 90 dramatic television series.  It starred Don Murray, Burt Reynolds, and Rita Moreno.

See also

List of nuclear holocaust fiction
Survivalism

References

External links
 
 "Pat Frank's 'Alas, Babylon,' 50 years later" in The Florida Times-Union

1959 American novels
1959 science fiction novels
American novels adapted into television shows
American post-apocalyptic novels
American science fiction novels
J. B. Lippincott & Co. books
Novels about nuclear war and weapons
Novels by Pat Frank
Novels set during World War III
Novels set in Florida